Gelvaran-e Bala (also Romanized as Gelvarān-e Bālā and Gol Varān-e Bālā) is a village in Koregah-e Gharbi Rural District, in the Central District of Khorramabad County, Lorestan Province, Iran. At the 2006 census, its population was 726, in 145 families.

References 

Towns and villages in Khorramabad County